Hulta is a settlement in Kronoberg County, Sweden.

References

Populated places in Kronoberg County